The Canadian National Pond Hockey Championships are held annually at the Deerhurst Resort in Huntsville, Muskoka District Municipality, Ontario, Canada.

The pond hockey variant used at the nationals plays 4 on 4 without a goalie, with two 15-minute halves and 5-minute halftime break. The winners of the three championship divisions are awarded the coveted Maple Cup.

Men's Ontario Championship 
The Ontario qualifier for the Canadian Nationals lasted only one year.  The host site was Valen's Conservation Area in Flamborough, Ontario.  The tournament is otherwise an annual event.  The Barrie Bruins defeated the Milton Moose Knuckles 14-8 to take the Ontario title.

Men's Open Championship Division 25+

Women's Open Championship Division 19+

Men's Masters Championship 35+ 
Masters Division is for players 35 years of age and older

Championships

2006 Championships
The first championships took place over one weekend.

In the Men's Open Division, the Rink Rake Greybeards defeated the Barrie Theta TTS Bruins to win the inaugural championship.

2007 Championships
The championships were aired nationally on TSN in a one-hour special.

In the Men's Open Division, in a rematch of last year's final, the Barrie Theta TTS Bruins defeated the Rink Rake Greybeards 14-11.

In the Women's Open Division, the Rink Rake Concordia Rinkles win the championship for the second straight year, defeating the Wade Belaks of Toronto 18-11.

2008 Championships

In the Men's Open Division, the Barrie Theta TTS Bruins defeated the Pond Hawks of North Bay, to be the first multiple year winner on the men's side, winning for the second year in a row.

In the Women's Open Division, the Ice Angels of Hamilton defeat the Wade Belaks from Toronto. The returning champions, Rink Rake Wrinkles from Vaudreuil-Dorion were defeated in the elimination round.

2009 Championships

References

Citations

External links 
 Canadian National Pond Hockey Championships homepage
 Echo Germanica: Canadian National Pond Hockey Championships! (2006)
 Canadian Western Regional Pond Hockey Championships
 Ontario Regional Pond Hockey Championships
 Eastern Canadian Pond Hockey Championships
  Quebecois Pond Hockey Championship

See also 
 U.S. Pond Hockey Championships
 World Pond Hockey Championships

Ice hockey tournaments in Canada
Pond hockey
2006 establishments in Ontario
Recurring sporting events established in 2006